The superior frontal sulcus is a sulcus between the superior frontal gyrus and the middle frontal gyrus.

See also
 Inferior frontal sulcus

Additional images

Sulci (neuroanatomy)
Frontal lobe